Erysiphe azerbaijanica is a species of powdery mildew in the family Erysiphaceae. It is found in Azerbaijan, where it grows on the leaves of sweet chestnut trees.

Taxonomy
The fungus was formally described as a new species in 2018 by Lamiya Abasova, Dilzara Aghayeva, and Susumu Takamatsu. The type specimen was collected near Baş Küngüt village (Shaki District), where it was found growing on sweet chestnut (Castanea sativa). Molecular phylogenetic analysis showed that the species forms its own clade in the Microsphaera lineage of genus Erysiphe. The species epithet refers to the country of the type locality.

Description
The fungus forms thin, white irregular patches on both sides of the leaves of its host. Foot cells are cylindrical and straight, typically measuring 31–53 by 5–7 μm. The conidia are mostly cylindrical and oblong with dimensions of 33–48 by 14–16 μm; they have a length/width ratio of 2–3.6. Erysiphe alphitoides, E. castaneae, and E. castaneigena are somewhat similar in morphology, but can be distinguished by the dimensions and form of their conidia and foot cells.

References

azerbaijanica
Fungi described in 2018
Fungi of Europe